C. grandis may refer to:
 Calomyscus grandis, the noble calomyscus, a mouse-like hamster species from Iran
 Calyptranthes grandis, a flowering plant species in the genus Calyptranthes
 Camarasaurus grandis, a dinosaur species
 Cantuaria grandis, a spider species in the genus Cantuaria found in New Zealand
 Capparis grandis, a flowering plant species in the genus Capparis
 Cassia grandis, the pink shower cassia, a plant species
 Cattleya grandis, the large laelia, an orchid species in the genus Cattleya found in Brazil
 Cephenemyia grandis, a botfly species in the genus Cephenemyia
 Chionodes grandis, a moth species in the genus Chionodes
 Chrysichthys grandis, the kukumai, a fish species found in Africa
 Chrysopilus grandis, a snipe fly species in the genus Chrysopilus
 Citrus grandis, the pomelo, a fruit plant native to Southeast Asia
 Clidicus grandis, a rove beetle species in the genus Clidicus
 Coccinia grandis, the ivy gourd, a tropical vine species
 Copablepharon grandis, the pale yellow dune moth, a moth species found in North America
 Coryphagrion grandis, a damselfly species found in Kenya, Tanzania and Mozambique
 Cricosaurus grandis, an extinct marine crocodyliform species from the Late Jurassic of England, France, Switzerland, Germany, Argentina, Cuba and Mexico
 Criorhina grandis, a hoverfly species in the genus Criorhina
 Crocidura grandis, the greater Mindanao shrew, a mammal species endemic to the Philippines
 Crossodactylus grandis, a frog species endemic to Brazil
 Cryptocarya grandis, the cinnamon laurel, a plant species in the genus Cryptocarya found in Australia
 Cymbospondylus grandis, a basal early ichthyosaur species from the middle and later years of the Triassic period found in Germany and Nevada

See also 
 Grandis (disambiguation)